Shedden is a surname. Notable people with the surname include: 

David Shedden (1944–2017), Scotland rugby player
Doug Shedden (born 1961), Canadian ice hockey player and coach
Doug Shedden (politician) (1937−2020), Australian politician
Frederick Shedden (1893–1971), Australian public servant
George Powell-Shedden (1916-1994), Royal Air Force pilot
Gilberto "Chito" Shedden, Costa Rican companion of the crocodile Pocho
Gordon Shedden (born 1979), Scottish auto racing driver
Iain Shedden (1957–2017), Scottish-born Australian musician and journalist
John Shedden (1825–1873), Scottish-born Canadian businessman
Roscow Shedden (1882–1956), Anglican colonial bishop
William Ralston Shedden-Ralston (1828–1889), British scholar and translator
Shedden family, British traders and privateers, including:
Robert Snedden (born c.1741), founder of the business
George Shedden (c.1769–1855), son of Robert
William George Shedden (c.1803–1872), son of George
Roscow Cole Shedden (c.1811–1877), son of George
George Shedden (died 1937)

See also
Shedden (disambiguation)
Snedden (disambiguation)